Alan Burgess (1 February 1915 – 10 April 1998) was an English Royal Air Force pilot and author who wrote several biographical and non-fiction books between the 1950s and the 1970s. He wrote biographies of Gladys Aylward, and Flora Sandes, and co-wrote Ingrid Bergman's autobiography. Bergman played Gladys Aylward in the film The Inn of the Sixth Happiness based on Burgess's biography.

Having served in the Royal Air Force during World War II, Burgess went on to write The Longest Tunnel: The True Story of World War II's Great Escape, the story of "The Great Escape".

Works

Novels

Non-fiction 

Biographies
 
 
 
 
 
 

History

Adaptations 

 The Inn of the Sixth Happiness (1958), film directed by Mark Robson, based on book The Inn of the Sixth Happiness
 Operation Daybreak (1975), film directed by Lewis Gilbert, based on book Seven Men at Daybreak

References

External links
 
 
 

1915 births
1998 deaths
English writers
Royal Air Force officers
British biographers
20th-century English historians
20th-century biographers